This is a list of libraries in Bulgaria.

National library 

 SS. Cyril and Methodius National Library

Research Libraries 
 Central Library of the Bulgarian Academy of Sciences
 Central Research and Technical Library 
 Central Medical Library

Regional libraries 

 Sofia City Library
 Regional Library "Dimitar Talev" (Blagoevgrad)
 Regional Library "P. K. Yavorov" (Burgas)
 Regional Library "Dora Gabe" (Dobrich)
 Regional Library "Aprilov-Palauzov" (Gabrovo)
 Regional Library "Hristo Smirnenski" (Haskovo)
 Regional Library "Nikola Y. Vaptsarov" (Kardzhali)
 Regional Library "Emanuil Popdimitrov" (Kyustendil)
 Regional Library "Prof. Benyu Tsonev" (Lovech)*
 Regional Library "Geo Milev" (Montana)
 Regional Library "Nikola Furnadzhiev" (Pazardzhik)
 Regional Library "Ivan Vazov" (Plovdiv)
 Regional Library "Prof. Boyan Penev" (Razgrad)
 Regional Library "Lyuben Karavelov" (Rousse)
 Regional Library "Partenii Pavlovich" (Silistra)
 Regional Library "Nikolai Vranchev" (Smolyan)
 Regional Library "Zaharii Kniazheski" (Stara Zagora)
 Regional Library "Petar Stapov"(Targovishte)
 Regional Library "Stiliyan Chilingirov" (Shumen)
 Regional Library "Pencho Slaveykov" (Varna)
 Regional Library "Petko Rachev Slaveykov" (Veliko Tarnovo)
 Regional Library "Hristo Botev" (Vratsa)

University Libraries 

 Library of American University in Bulgaria 
 Library of South-West University “Neofit Rilski” 
 Library of International High Business School 
 Library of Burgas Free University 
 Library of Varna University of Management
 Library of Technical University
 Library of Agricultural University 
 Library of University of Rousse "Angel Kanchev"
 Library of the Diplomatic institute
 Library of National Academy for Theatre and Film Arts 
 Library of New Bulgarian University
 Library of Sofia University "St. Kliment Ohridski" 
 Library of Technical University – Sofia 
 Library of University of architecture, civil engineering and geodesy
 Library of University of chemical technology and metallurgy 
 Library of University of library science and information technologies
 Central Medical Library of Medical University 
 Library of Shumen University "Episkop Konstantin Preslavski" 
 Library of Trakia University
 Library of Academy of Economics
 Library of Varna Free University "Chernorizets Hrabar" 
 Library of University of Economics
 Library of Medical University – Varna "Prof. Dr. Paraskev Stoyanov" 
 Library of Veliko Tarnovo University "St. St. Cyril and Methodius"

Chitalishte Public Libraries 
 City Library "Paisii Hilendarski" 
 Library of Chitalishte "Paisii Hilendarski – 1870" 
 Library of Chitalishte "Nikola Vaptsarov" 
 Library "Ivan Vazov" of Chitalishte "Hristo Botev – 1884" 
 Public library "Penyo Penev" 
 Library of Chitalishte
 Library of Chitalishte "Svetlina – 1896" 
 Library of Chitalishte "Prosveta"
 City Library "Petia Iordanova" 
 City Library "Iskra" 
 Library of Chitalishte "Postoyanstvo" 
 Library of Chitalishte "Dinjo Sivkov – 1870" 
 City Library "Stoian Drinov" 
 Library of Chitalishte "Razvitie"
 Library of Chitalishte "Georgi Tarnev" 
 Library of Chitalishte "Sv. sv. Kiril i Metodii" 
 Library "Tzoncho Rodev" of Chitalishte "Aleko Konstantinov – 1884"
 Library of Chitalishte "Otec Paisii – 1919" 
 City Library (Sevlievo, Gabrovo Region)
 City Library (Svishtov, Veliko Tarnovo Region)
 Library of Chitalishte "Elenka i Kiril Avramovi – 1856" 
 Library of Chitalishte "Gradishte – 1907" 
 Library of Chitalishte "Zora" 
 Library of Chitalishte "Tzar Boris III – 1928" 
 National Library for the Blind "Lui Brail" 
 Library of Chitalishte "Rodina" 
 Library of Chitalishte "Saglasie – 1869"
 Library of Chitalishte "Prosveta – 1927"

See also
 COBISS

References

External links
 The Bulgarian Library and Information Association

 
Bulgaria
Libraries
Libraries